Bishop Joseph may refer to:

John Joseph (bishop) (1932–1998), Roman Catholic Bishop of Faisalabad
Rayappu Joseph (born 1940), former Roman Catholic Bishop of Mannar

See also
Joseph Bishop (born 1932), academic administrator and author